David Whiteford (born 9 August 1944) is a Scottish former footballer who played mainly as a right back. The greater part of his senior career (which did not begin until his early 20s once he had completed his education in order to become a schoolteacher) was spent with Motherwell where he played for eight years and made over 200 appearances, experiencing a relegation from the top division in 1967–68 followed by promotion as winners of Division Two the following season, as well as taking part in a Scottish League Cup semi-final later in 1969 and eliminating Tottenham Hotspur from the Texaco Cup in 1970.

He moved to Falkirk in 1973, spending three seasons with the Bairns, then a further three with local rivals East Stirlingshire. Now well into his 30s, he had a spell at junior level with Rutherglen Glencairn before retiring. In 1985 he returned to East Stirlingshire as manager, but the part-time club failed to improve on their status as one of the weaker teams in the bottom division and he was dismissed in 1987.

His father Jock, younger brother Jocky (a teammate at Falkirk and Glencairn, and coaching colleague at East Stirlingshire) and cousin Derek Whiteford were also footballers.

Managerial statistics

Honours
Motherwell
 Scottish Football League Division Two: 1968–69

References

1944 births
Scottish footballers
Sportspeople from Shotts
Footballers from North Lanarkshire
East Stirlingshire F.C. players
Motherwell F.C. players
Falkirk F.C. players
Rutherglen Glencairn F.C. players
Scottish Junior Football Association players
Scottish Football League players
Living people
Association football fullbacks
Scottish football managers
East Stirlingshire F.C. managers
Scottish Football League managers
Alumni of the University of Strathclyde
Scottish schoolteachers